Qızıl Şäreq is a rural locality (a posyolok) in Biektaw District, Tatarstan. The population was 61 as of 2010.

Qızıl Şäreq is located 17 km east of Biektaw, district's administrative centre, and 43 km northeast of Qazan, republic's capital, by road.

The village was established in 1930s. It forms part of the district since 1965.

There are 5 streets in the village.

References

External links 
 

Rural localities in Vysokogorsky District